Tokomaro or Tokumaro (徳麻呂) was a soldier of 7th-century AD Japan, during the Asuka period. He and four slaves of the Ōi temple served in the Jinshin War of 672 and fought at the Battle of Nakatsu-michi.

His name appears in the history book Nihon Shoki at the Battle of Nakatsu-michi of Yamato Province at the beginning of the 7th month of the year 672 (by the Japanese calendar). Yamato had been one of the two major fronts of the war. Ōtomo no Fukei, the commander general of this front for Prince Ōama's (Emperor Tenmu) side, divided his army into three divisions along the Kamitsu-michi ("upper road"), Nakatsu-michi ("middle road") and Shimotsu-michi ("lower road"). Enemy general Inukai no Isokimi dispatched his commander Ioi no Kujira and sent 200 soldiers against the thin center of Fukei. Five slaves of Ōi temple, including Tokomaro, took the lead in the defence and shot arrows, which stopped Ioi's advance. Then Fukei's right division broke Inukai's left at Kamitsu-michi, and rushed to the rear of the enemy, turning the flank. Yamato province was won by Fukei soon after this battle.

The Nihon Shoki describes details of the war but merely mentions background of rank-and-file soldiers. "Slaves of Oi temple" is evidence of the broad mobilization effort and an example of the loyalty of slaves in ancient Japan.

Footnotes

References
Masajirō Takigawa, History of Japanese Slave Economy, Shimizu Shobō, 1957. (滝川政次郎『日本奴隷経済史』、清水書房、1957年。)
Mitsuo Tōyama, Jinshin War: Mith and Fact of the Burth of Tennō, Chūōkōron-sha, 1996. (遠山美都男『壬申の乱　天皇誕生の神話と史実』、中央公論社（中公新書）、1996年、。)
Tarō Sakamoto, Saburō Ienaga, Mutsusada Inoue and Susumu Ōno noted and translated Nihonshoki, Iwanami Shoten, 1995. (坂本太郎・家永三郎・井上光貞・大野晋『日本書紀』5（岩波文庫）、岩波書店、1995年、。)
Noriyuki Kojima, Kojirō Naoki, Kazutami Nishimiya and Masamori Mori noted and translated, Nihonshoki, Shōgakkan, 1998. (小島憲之・直木孝次郎・西宮一民・蔵中進・毛利正守・校注・訳『日本書紀』3（新編日本古典文学全集）、小学館、1998年、) 。

Japanese warriors
People of Asuka-period Japan